Lucie is a Tiriyó village at the mouth of the Lucie River in the Sipaliwini District of Suriname. The village was founded in 2004.

Like the inhabitants of Amatopo, the villagers of Lucie earn money selling souvenirs to tourists on Arapahu island. The village was founded, because Kwamalasamutu became overcrowded. As of 2005, the villagers living there are a vanguard for future migration.

The inhabitants of Lucie identify as Okomoyana, a sub-identity of the Tiriyó.

Lucie was flooded during the 2008 rainy season.

Notes

References 

Indigenous villages in Suriname
Populated places in Sipaliwini District